Meg Mallon (born April 14, 1963) is an American professional golfer. She became a member of the LPGA Tour in 1987 and won 18 LPGA Tour events, including four major championships, during her career. Mallon was inducted into the World Golf Hall of Fame in 2017.

Early life and amateur career
Mallon was born on April 14, 1963 in Natick, Massachusetts. She started playing golf at the age of 7. She won the Michigan Amateur Championship title in 1983. She attended Mercy High School in Farmington Hills, Michigan.

Mallon attended Ohio State University, where she earned All-Conference honors from 1984–85 and was the runner-up at the 1985 Big Ten Championship.

Professional career
Mallon joined the LPGA Tour in 1987. Her breakthrough year was 1991, when she won four times.  Two of her victories were majors, the Mazda LPGA Championship and the U.S. Women's Open. She was also named Female Player of the Year by the Golf Writers Association of
America and Most Improved Player by Golf Digest. She would win two more majors, the du Maurier Classic in 2000 and her second U.S. Women's Open in 2004.  She also won the season-ending ADT Championship in 2003.

Mallon won a total of 18 events on the tour, including  four major championships. She also had nine top-10 placings on the money list, her best being second in 1991.

Mallon played for the United States in the Solheim Cup eight times: in 1992, 1994, 1996, 1998, 2000, 2002, 2003, and 2005. She served as an assistant team captain in 2009. She is the team captain in 2013.

Mallon was inducted into the Ohio State Athletic Hall of Fame in 1996, the Michigan Golf Hall of Fame in 2002, and the Michigan Sports Hall of Fame in 2008. She was recognized during the LPGA's 50th Anniversary in 2000 as one of the LPGA's top-50 players and teachers. She was a non-voting member of the LPGA Tour Player Executive Committee in 1999, 2004, and 2008.

Mallon announced her retirement from professional golf on July 7, 2010, shortly before the start of the 2010 U.S. Women's Open. She was inducted into the
Palm Beach County Hall of Fame in 2011.

In 2003 during the second round of the Welch's/Fry's Championship, Mallon became the first player in LPGA history to shoot a 60, one stroke off the LPGA Tour's all-time record of 59 set by Annika Sörenstam in 2001. She is tied for second in the LPGA's all-time records for most career aces.

Professional wins (20)

LPGA Tour wins (18)

LPGA Tour playoff record (2–1)

Other wins (1)
1998 JCPenney Classic (with Steve Pate)

Legends Tour wins (1)
2014 Walgreens Charity Championship

Major championships

Wins (4)

Results timeline

^ The Women's British Open replaced the du Maurier Classic as an LPGA major in 2001.

CUT = missed the half-way cut.
"T" indicates a tie for a place.

Summary
Starts – 84
Wins – 4
2nd-place finishes – 4
3rd-place finishes – 1
Top 3 finishes – 9
Top 5 finishes – 15
Top 10 finishes – 21
Top 25 finishes – 41
Missed cuts – 18
Most consecutive cuts made – 24
Longest streak of top-10s – 2 (5 times)

Team appearances
Professional
Solheim Cup (representing the United States): 1992, 1994 (winners), 1996 (winners), 1998 (winners), 2000, 2002 (winners), 2003, 2005 (winners), 2013 (non-playing captain)
World Cup (representing the United States): 2005
Handa Cup (representing the United States): 2010 (winners), 2011 (winners), 2014 (winners), 2015 (winners)

See also
List of golfers with most LPGA Tour wins
List of golfers with most LPGA major championship wins

References

External links

American female golfers
Ohio State Buckeyes women's golfers
LPGA Tour golfers
Winners of LPGA major golf championships
Solheim Cup competitors for the United States
World Golf Hall of Fame inductees
Golfers from Massachusetts
Golfers from Florida
People from Natick, Massachusetts
People from Ocean Ridge, Florida
Sportspeople from Middlesex County, Massachusetts
Sportspeople from the Miami metropolitan area
1963 births
Living people